The 2006 British Speedway Championship was the 46th edition of the British Speedway Championship. The Final took place on 11 June at Belle Vue Stadium in Manchester, England. The Championship was won by Scott Nicholls, who beat Joe Screen, Simon Stead and Chris Harris in the final heat.

Final 
11 June 2006
 Belle Vue Stadium, Manchester

{| width=100%
|width=50% valign=top|

Qualifying

Final

See also 
 British Speedway Championship

References 

British Speedway Championship
Great Britain